Acharya Virasena (792-853 CE), also known as Veerasena, was a Digambara monk and belonged to the lineage of Acharya Kundakunda. He  was an Indian mathematician and Jain philosopher and scholar. He was also known as a famous orator and an accomplished poet. His most reputed work is the Jain treatise Dhavala. The late Dr. Hiralal Jain places the completion of this treatise in 816 AD.

Virasena was a noted mathematician. He gave the derivation of the volume of a frustum by a sort of infinite procedure. He worked with the concept of Ardha Chheda: the number of times a number could be divided by 2; effectively base-2 logarithms. He also worked with logarithms in base 3 (trakacheda) and base 4 (caturthacheda).

Virasena gave the approximate formula C = 3d + (16d+16)/113 to relate the circumference of a circle, C, to its diameter, d.  For large values of d, this gives the approximation π ≈ 355/113 = 3.14159292..., which is more accurate than the approximation π ≈ 3.1416 given by Aryabhata in the Aryabhatiya.

Life
Virasena was proficient in astrology, grammar, logic, mathematics and prosody. He wrote Dhavala, a commentary on Jain canon Shatakhandagama. He also started the work on Jayadhavalaa which was competed by his disciples. He was among the jewels of Rashtrakuta king Amoghavarsha.

His lineage started with Chandrasena who initiated Aryanandi. Aryanandi initiated Virasena and Jayasena. Virasena initiated six disciples who were Dasharayguru, Jinasena, Vinayasena, Shripal, Padmasena and Devasena. Dasharayguru and Jinasena initiated Gunabhadra who later initiated Lokasena. Vinayasena initiated Kumarasena who started the Kashtha Sangha.

See also
Indian mathematics
Umaswami

References

Citations

Sources

External links

 Translation of part of the Dhavala.

792 births
853 deaths
Digambara Acharyas
Indian Jain monks
9th-century Indian Jains
9th-century Jain monks
9th-century Indian monks
9th-century philosophers
9th-century Indian mathematicians
Indian mathematicians